Verkhovoy is a shield volcano located in the northern part of Kamchatka Peninsula, Russia.

See also
 List of volcanoes in Russia

References 
 

Mountains of the Kamchatka Peninsula
Volcanoes of the Kamchatka Peninsula
Shield volcanoes of Russia
Pleistocene shield volcanoes
Pleistocene Asia